Charlene P. Kammerer is an American bishop in The United Methodist Church, elected and consecrated to the Episcopacy in 1996.

Born January 5, 1948, Kammerer graduated from Wesleyan College in 1970. She received a Master of Christian Education and Master of Divinity from Garrett-Evangelical Theological Seminary. She received a Doctor of Ministry from United Theological Seminary in 1991.

Kammerer is married to Leigh Kammerer.  They have one son, Chris.

Ordained ministry
Ordained Deacon, Florida Conference, 1975
Ordained Elder, Florida Conference, 1977
Campus Minister, Duke University
District Superintendent, Tallahassee District, Florida Conference
Bishop, Western North Carolina Conference, 1996
Bishop, Virginia Annual Conference, 2004

References
The Council of Bishops of the United Methodist Church 
InfoServ, the official information service of The United Methodist Church.

See also
 List of bishops of the United Methodist Church

United Methodist bishops of the Southeastern Jurisdiction
Garrett–Evangelical Theological Seminary alumni
Living people
1948 births
United Theological Seminary alumni